KPDC-LP, UHF digital channel 25, was a low-powered television station licensed to Indio, California, United States. The station was owned by Desert Chapel Ministries from Palm Springs.

About
It was an analog low-power and translator station that was licensed to Desert Springs, Inc/Desert Broadcasting, Inc. The president of Desert Broadcasting was Fred Donaldson. He is the Application certifier for Desert Springs Inc. Donaldson is a pastor of Desert Chapel Ministries and he was a feature in the 30 minute Christian slot on KPDC.

Today, it no longer broadcasts.

References

PDC-LP
Television channels and stations established in 1999
1999 establishments in California
Defunct television stations in the United States
PDC-LP
Television channels and stations disestablished in 2015
2015 disestablishments in California